Madura S. Balakrishnan (1917–1990) was born and raised in Madras, Madras Presidency, British India. He was a well-known botanist and he served various government positions and worked for some time at the University of Pune (Currently known as Savitribai Phule Pune University). He was the student of phycologist Professor M.O.P. Iyengar.

Early life
Balakrishnan was born on 10 February 1917 in Madras.  His parents were both active in national freedom efforts.  His father gave up a prestigious government position to join the civil disobedience movement.  His mother was a Gandhian and an eminent writer in Tamil. Balakrishnan had been educated in Madras and took his B.Sc. (Hons.) degree in botany from Presidency College, Madras. He later joined the university Botany Laboratory, Chepauk, Madras to work for his M.Sc. degree under the guidance of the late Professor M.O.P.Iyengar. He was a fine sportsman; in his earlier days he played cricket well. At the same time he was keenly interested in Carnatic music. As an artist he had an exquisite touch for drawing. These activities brought him great delight.

After taking his M.Sc. degree, he joined the Department of Information and Broadcasting, Government of India as a sub-editor. Soon the academically bent Balakrishnan left this job and took up a research fellowship at the Agricultural College and Research Institute, Coimbatore. After the expiry of this fellowship, he worked for sometime as an phycologist in the Government of Madras, and after a short time moved to the central Rice Research Institute, Cuttack, Orissa where he worked as a research assistant in mycology. In 1950, he joined a scheme on Fungal Antibiotics at the R.G. Kar Medical College, Calcutta as a mycologist under the Late Professor S.R. Bose. He completed this assignment in June 1953.

Early career
In 1957, he took two years leave of absence from his lecturer post to work under Professor M.O.P.Iyengar for his Ph.D., which he obtained in 1959, and to develop on a scheme to control algae in the Mithalpur Salt Works, sponsored by Tata Industries. Soon after his return he was appointed as a Reader in Botany in the University of Poona. Between April 1965 and May 1966, he was engaged in a research project that investigated the Pacific Cryptonemiaceae at the Friday Harbour Lab, University of Washington, as a National Science Foundation research associate in Marine Cryptogamic Botany. On his way back to India in 1966, he spent a fortnight in Japan. He worked for a week in the Cryptogamic section of the National Science Museum Tokyo with Dr. Mitsuo Chihara, and for another week at Sapporo in the Okamura Algal Herbarium of the Hokkaido University and with Professor Yukio Yamada, doyen of Japanese Algologists.

University of Pune
He was appointed as a lecturer in Botany at the University of Poona. Balakrishnan was one of the senior students of Professor M.O.P. Iyengar, the father of Indian Algology. With his unique and highly skillful style of teaching, Balakrishnan made Algology a popular subject in the Department. In the beginning, his research programmes were centered on marine red algae which resulted in the creation of a new family, the Corynomorphaceae and taxonomic revisions in the orders Cryptonemiales and Gigartinales.

Based on his comparative studies of Indian and U.S. Pacific Cryptonemiaceae, Balakrishnan established two new Genera- Isabbottia and Norrisia. Subsequently, with the help of his doctoral students, he initiated broad based studies on freshwater and marine algae, their systematics, life histories, morphology, cytology and ecology resulting in nationally and internationally recognized contributions.

Some examples of his contributions are life history studies in Batrachospermum, studies on taxonomy and reproduction in Solieriaceae, cytology and life history of Indian Scytosiphonaceae, limnology of some of the lakes, algae in relation to water pollution, air borne algae etc. After his superannuation two of his students Professor B. B. Chaugule and Professor V. R. Gunale followed the path set by him while paying attention to current developments in Algology. In 1970 he took charge as Head of the Department of Botany, Poona University, and in 1972 he was appointed as Professor of Botany. In this capacity he continued until his retirement in 1978. During his tenure, the Department of Botany flourished with the introduction of modern disciplines, and he gradually built up a research tradition in Phycology. He also guided quite a few students, some in branches other than Phycology, for the Ph.D. Degree of the University of Poona. In 1978, he was at Shivaji University Kolhapur continuing his teaching and research activities. From 1980 to 1986 he was in the Centre of Advanced Studies in Botany at the Madras University working on Indian marine algae.

Contributions to algology
Research activity was central to Balakrishnan. He was actively involved in it until he died. His studies and research interests were not restricted solely to phycology alone, but extended to mycology as well—his earlier papers being on the subject of fungi. At Coimbatore he engaged himself in the compilation of a monograph on the diseases caused phythiaceous fungi. At the Central Rice Research Institute he focused his attention on the diseases of rice. He was also one of the contributors to the Tamil Encyclopedia along with Professor Sadasivan.

Balakrishnan's algal work was largely influenced by the late Professor M.O.P. Iyengar, who emphasized the need for information on morphology, cytology and the life history of Indian algae, information that could be utilized in teaching. All of the published work of Balakrishnan on the red algae were aimed at this objective, and a series of papers on forms ranging from Liagora to Polysiphonia was the result. His most outstanding efforts went into the study of the Cryptonmeiales and the Gigartinales.  He established the family Corynomorphaceae and created two new genera, Isabottia and Norrisia.  His work on Batrachospermum and Sirodotia of the Batrachospermales, established the existence of a heteromorphic alternation of generations, the sporophyte being filamentous and bearing a highly modified type of sporangium involving the formation of elimination cells during a modified meiotic process.

His intensive taxonomic studies on the red algae culminated in the preparation of a book on the Indian Rhodophyta along with his close associates Professors T.V.Desikachary V. Krishnamurthy.

The marine brown algae also received his attention. Cytological studies on the Ectocarpaceae had indicated the need for cytotaxonomical revision of this vexing complex. Studies on the cytology and life history of the Indian Scytosiphonaceae (Colpomenia, Iyengaria, Rosenvingea) had shown interesting developmental patterns. Intensive studies on the freshwater algae had also been done simultaneously, oogamy, a rather rare phenomenon was described in a new species of Golenkiniopsis from Pashan, and a new species of Sphaerelloopsis was reported from Khandala. The interesting life history of Pyrobotrys (Uva) which had an independent alternating zygotic phase (Chlorobrachis) was elucidated by him. His studies on the reproduction of the various algae was extended to Pleodiorina calipyriformis, Gloeochaete and Physocitium. Later two additional species of Sphaerellopsis from Khandala had also been reported.  He studied the Chlorococcales of Poona. Studies were also been done on Nelliecarteria, Gloeodendron, the rare filamentous alga Chaetonemopsis, cytology of Rhizoclonium and Cladophora algae of polluted waters, aerial algae, algae associated with Bryophytes etc.

His review of papers on the conducting systems in fossil brown and red algae, and recent trends and developments in Phycology were significant not only to the research students but also to the teachers of Phycology.

Busy as he was, he found time to attend many symposia and conventions. His papers revealed an analytical and critical approach as well as the depth of his knowledge. He participated in the ICAR/UNESCO, International Symposium in Algology in 1960 held in Delhi. While in the United States, he participated in the Fifth International Seaweed Symposium at Halifax, Canada in August 1965.  He also attended the Annual Convention of the American Institute of Biological Sciences at Champaign Urbana, Illinois in August 1965, the triple session of the American Association for the Advancement of Science at Berkeley, California in December 1965, and January 1966.

Balakrishnan was also a member of many learned societies including: the Indian Phytopathological Society, the Phycological Society of India, the International Phycological Society, the Indian Association of Biological Sciences, the Phycological Society of America, the International Society of Plant Morphologists, the Indian Botanical Society and the Mycological Society of India.

As well, he contributed a few articles on Botany to the Viswa Kosh in Marathi. He was on the editorial board for the publication Algal Monograph by the I.C.A.R.  He was also on the editorial board of the journal, Phykos and the Journal of Science and Technology, University of Poona. He was a member of the Expert Committee of the Central Salt and Marine Chemical Research Institute, Bhavnagar.

References

20th-century Indian botanists
Indian phycologists
Scientists from Chennai
1917 births
1990 deaths